Brevihamaparvovirus is a genus of viruses in subfamily Hamaparvovirinae of the family Parvoviridae. Mosquitoes serve as natural hosts. There are two species in this genus.

Taxonomy
The following two species are assigned to the genus:

Dipteran brevihamaparvovirus 1
Dipteran brevihamaparvovirus 2

Structure
Viruses in genus Brevihamaparvovirus are non-enveloped and have T=1 icosahedral symmetry. The diameter is around 21-22 nm. Genomes are linear, around 4kb in length.

Life cycle
Viral replication is nuclear. Entry into the host cell is achieved by attachment to host receptors, which mediates clathrin-mediated endocytosis. Replication follows the rolling-hairpin model. DNA-templated transcription, with some alternative splicing mechanism is the method of transcription. 
Mosquitoes serve as the natural host.

References

External links
 Viralzone: Brevidensovirus
  ICTV Brevidensovirus

Parvoviruses
Virus genera